The Saxon I F (one F) was a class of one 0-4-0 fireless steam locomotive built for the Royal Saxon State Railways.

History 
The locomotive was manufactured in 1917 by the  Sächsischen Maschinenfabrik in Chemnitz with the serial number 3981 for the Wülknitz Sleeper Works (Schwellentränkwerk Wülknitz; now the Oberbauwerk Wülknitz) as a shunting locomotive. For reasons of  fire protection the use of a "fire-free" locomotive was desired, especially as there was enough available steam to operate the locomotive.

About 1970, the locomotive was withdrawn by  Oberbauwerk Wülknitz, and was subsequently scrapped.

Similar locomotives 
Four similar locomotives were built for various industries between 1914 and 1916. The locomotives differed both in the dimensions of the steam engine and in the permitted operating pressure of the steam accumulator . One locomotive (for Lange of Auerhammer) was built as a crane locomotive.

The Sächsische Maschinenfabrik built another locomotive in 1922 with the serial number 4536 for their own use.

References 

 
 
 

Sächsische Maschinenfabrik locomotives
01 F
Standard gauge locomotives of Germany
0-4-0 locomotives
Fireless steam locomotives
Railway locomotives introduced in 1917
Shunting locomotives